Dinosaur is a statutory town in Moffat County, Colorado, United States. As of the 2020 census, the population was 243, down from 339 at the 2010 census.

Dinosaur is a part of the Craig, CO Micropolitan Statistical Area.

The town of Dinosaur was originally known as "Baxter Springs", owned by Art and Fanny Baxter. It was renamed "Artesia" for its valued water supply when a town was platted to accommodate the oil boom in the 1940s. The current name was adopted in 1966, to capitalize on the town's proximity to Dinosaur National Monument. The Dinosaur National Monument headquarters is located just east of the town on U.S. Highway 40.

Geography
Dinosaur is located in the southwest corner of Moffat County at  (40.241560, -109.008747). US-40 runs along the northern border of the town, leading east  to Craig, the county seat, and west  to Vernal, Utah. Colorado State Highway 64 has its northern terminus in Dinosaur and leads southeast  to Rangely.

Many streets in the town are named after dinosaurs, including Cletisaurus Circle, Tyrannosaurus Trail, and Antrodemus Alley.

Demographics

As of the census of 2000, there were 320 people, 124 households, and 88 families residing in the town. The racial makeup of the town was 98.43% White, 0.31% from other races, and 1.25% from two or more races. Hispanic or Latino of any race were 3.76% of the population.

There were 124 households, out of which 34.7% had children under the age of 18 living with them, 57.3% were married couples living together, 9.7% had a female householder with no husband present, and 29.0% were non-families. 25.0% of all households were made up of individuals, and 12.9% had someone living alone who was 65 years of age or older.  The average household size was 2.57 and the average family size was 3.10.

In the town, the population was spread out, with 28.5% under the age of 18, 9.4% from 18 to 24, 26.6% from 25 to 44, 23.5% from 45 to 64, and 11.9% who were 65 years of age or older.  The median age was 36 years. For every 100 females, there were 96.9 males.  For every 100 females age 18 and over, there were 94.9 males.

The median income for a household in the town was $31,250, and the median income for a family was $31,250. Males had a median income of $43,500 versus $16,250 for females. The per capita income for the town was $12,904.  About 18.8% of families and 17.9% of the population were below the poverty line, including 15.6% of those under age 18 and 14.3% of those age 65 or over.

Economy
In addition to tourism related to the Dinosaur National Monument, cannabis dispensaries have been a significant part of Dinosaur's economy since the late 2010s. Because recreational cannabis is legal in Colorado but illegal in bordering Utah, Dinosaur's cannabis dispensaries serve Utah residents driving across the state line to purchase the drug legally.

In popular culture
In the October 2009 issue of Dark Avengers by Marvel Comics, Dinosaur is the site of a portal that consumes Norman Osborn's Dark Avengers. In addition, Dinosaur is also the hometown of the Marvel Comics villain Molecule Man.
In a 2022 television commercial for GoDaddy, an online retailer's staff celebrate after receiving an order from Dinosaur.

See also

Bibliography of Colorado
Index of Colorado-related articles
Outline of Colorado
List of municipalities in Colorado
List of places in Colorado
Prehistory of Colorado

References

External links

Town of Dinosaur website
CDOT map of the Town of Dinosaur

Towns in Moffat County, Colorado
Towns in Colorado